The Nieuport Triplane was a series of Nieuport 10/17 based triplanes built by Nieuport.

Design and Development

Nieuport 10 Triplane
In 1915, Gustave Delage modified a Nieuport 10 with a set of triplane wings in an unusual fore-aft-fore stagger for testing, this design was later patented in 1916.

Nieuport 17 Triplane

Two  Nieuport 17s, modified with reversed stagger on the upper mainplane and armed with one Lewis machine gun) were tested by the Royal Naval Air Service (RNAS).

Nieuport 17bis triplane
One more triplane, modified from a Nieuport 17bis, was also tested and allotted to No. 11 Squadron RNAS until June 1917.  Having never been ordered into production, it was never given an official designation.

References 

Triplanes
Triplanes